The Departmental Council of Aveyron is the deliberative assembly of the French department of Aveyron. It is chaired by Arnaud Viala.

Vice-presidents 
The president of the departmental council is supported by 10 vice-presidents chosen from among the departmental councillors. Each of them has a delegation of authority.

References 

Aveyron
Aveyron